The 1951 Chicago Cubs season was the 80th season of the Chicago Cubs franchise, the 76th in the National League and the 36th at Wrigley Field. The Cubs finished eighth and last in the National League with a record of 62–92.

Offseason 
 October 10, 1950: Hank Edwards and cash were traded by the Cubs to the Brooklyn Dodgers for Dee Fondy and Chuck Connors.

Regular season

Season standings

Record vs. opponents

Notable transactions 
 June 15, 1951: Johnny Schmitz, Rube Walker, Andy Pafko, and Wayne Terwilliger were traded by the Cubs to the Brooklyn Dodgers for Eddie Miksis, Bruce Edwards, Joe Hatten, and Gene Hermanski.

Roster

Player stats

Batting

Starters by position 
Note: Pos = Position; G = Games played; AB = At bats; H = Hits; Avg. = Batting average; HR = Home runs; RBI = Runs batted in

Other batters 
Note: G = Games played; AB = At bats; H = Hits; Avg. = Batting average; HR = Home runs; RBI = Runs batted in

Pitching

Starting pitchers 
Note: G = Games pitched; IP = Innings pitched; W = Wins; L = Losses; ERA = Earned run average; SO = Strikeouts

Other pitchers 
Note: G = Games pitched; IP = Innings pitched; W = Wins; L = Losses; ERA = Earned run average; SO = Strikeouts

Relief pitchers 
Note: G = Games pitched; W = Wins; L = Losses; SV = Saves; ERA = Earned run average; SO = Strikeouts

Farm system 

LEAGUE CHAMPIONS: Topeka, Carthage

References

External links
1951 Chicago Cubs season at Baseball Reference

Chicago Cubs seasons
Chicago Cubs season
Chicago Cubs